Abdallah Mohamed (died 3 February 2000) was a Comorian politician. He served as prime minister of Comoros from January 7, 1976, until December 22, 1978. He was a nephew of Mohamed Ahmed. For most of that time he was serving under President Ali Soilih. After Soilih was overthrown and killed in a Coup d'état, Mohamed remained in his post for a few months under the new regime of Ahmed Abdallah. He was eventually dismissed, however. He died in Mutsamudu, on the island of Anjouan  in 2000.

References 

Year of birth missing
2000 deaths
Prime Ministers of the Comoros